Semyorka, or 7TV was a Russian federal television channel, broadcast under the UTH Russia television network from Moscow, Russia. The channel was officially founded in 1997 and on 17 September 2001 it was registered as the national level television channel.

Between 2010/11 season, MegaFon sponsored the channel.

Originally, 7TV broadcast sports. From March to August 2011, it says the channel was "reconstruction" before renaming. The channel used to broadcast a wide variety of TV programs related to entertainment, series and movies. As of March 1, 2011, 7TV rebranded itself as "SevenTV" with a new slogan "entertained benefit". Headquarters of the channel is located at the 3rd floor of the shopping centre on the Varshavskoye Highway in Moscow. According to TNS, in the third quarter of 2010 the average viewership for the category "18-54 years old", increased to 1.5% compared to the rating of 0.2% in 2009.

Despite those ratings increases, the channel was shut down on December 31, 2011. It was replaced with the Russian version of Disney Channel on same day. The final program aired on the channel was the 1973 film Three Gifts for Cinderella.

See also
 BBC One
 Rede Tupi
 Banahaw Broadcasting Corporation
 RCTV
 ATV
 ABS-CBN

References

External links
  

Defunct television channels in Russia
Television channels and stations established in 2000
Television channels and stations disestablished in 2011
2000 establishments in Russia
2011 disestablishments in Russia
Mass media in Moscow